Cameron Pierce Mizell is an American artist, songwriter, singer, record producer and owner of Chango Studios. He began producing music in 2003 & has worked with Billboard top charting artists such as Sleeping With Sirens, Memphis May Fire, Woe Is Me, Machine Gun Kelly & Avril Lavigne.  He was lead singer for the bands She Can't Breathe & Last Winter, who appeared on television shows My Super Sweet 16 & The Hills. His solo project, Time Traveller - Morla And The Red Balloon was released by Rise Records.

Production discography

References

External links
  Production Credits 
  Production Credits 
  Chango Studios
  Chango Studios Myspace

Living people
Record producers from Florida
1983 births
Place of birth missing (living people)